Vadim Abramov (born November 12, 1980; Kyiv, Ukraine) is a Ukrainian TV presenter, actor, and DJ.

Biography
Abramov was born on November 12, 1980, in Kyifv, Ukraine. After graduating from school with honors, he entered the National Technical University of Ukraine "Kyiv Polytechnic Institute" at the Faculty of Management and Marketing. In 1999, the first working morning TV presenter entertainment show on TV BIZ-TV Ukraine, then became editor of the TV channel. In 2009, professional DJ career starts, and he participated in the theater-studio improvisation "Black Square". Later, Vadim Abramov transferred to another improvisational theater, which included taking part in various performances. By the close of MTV Ukraine was the leading talk show Open Space, in 2013 became the leading comedy show "cabinet" with Svetlana Permyakova the TV channel Pyatnica!, (Russia) and Novyi Kanal (Ukraine). 2015 was the leading social reality "Revizor" on Novyi Kanal (Ukraine), replacing Olha Freimut. He is fluent in Ukrainian, English, French, and Spanish.

References

External links
 
 
 Official site of the show "Inspector" on New Channel Ukraine

Television presenters from Kyiv
Living people
1980 births
Journalists from Kyiv
Kyiv Polytechnic Institute alumni
Ukrainian DJs
Ukrainian male stage actors
Musicians from Kyiv
Actors from Kyiv